Gorgi may refer to:

Places
Gorgi, Iran, a village in Iran
Seyl Gorgi, a village in Iran
Gorgi-ye Manderek, a village in Iran

People
Abdelaziz Gorgi (1928–2008), Tunisian artist
Gorgi Coghlan, Australian television presenter
Ǵorǵi Hristov (born 1976),footballer and coach
Gorgi Krasovski, Georgian footballer
Ǵorǵi Kolozov (1948–2003), Macedonian actor
Gorgi Popstefanov (born 1987), Macedonian road racing cyclist 
Gorgi Sobhi (1884–1964) Egyptian medical professor

See also 
 Gurgi (disambiguation)